Anissa Lahmari (born 17 February 1997) is a French professional footballer who plays as a midfielder for Division 1 Féminine club Guingamp.

Early life
Lahmari was born in Saint-Cloud and is of Algerian and Moroccan descent.

Career
Formed in the academy of Paris Saint-Germain, Lahmari made her senior debut in a 2–0 away win against Glasgow City in the quarter-finals of UEFA Women's Champions League on 22 March 2015. She started the match, playing 84 minutes and scored the opening goal. However, she struggled to find playing time at the capital club in following seasons and was loaned out to Reading, Paris FC and ASJ Soyaux. She announced her departure from Paris Saint-Germain in May 2019 after contract expiration.

Career statistics

References

External links
 
 

1997 births
Living people
Sportspeople from Saint-Cloud
French women's footballers
France women's youth international footballers
Women's association football midfielders
GPSO 92 Issy players
Paris Saint-Germain Féminine players
Reading F.C. Women players
Paris FC (women) players
ASJ Soyaux-Charente players
En Avant Guingamp (women) players
Division 1 Féminine players
French expatriate footballers
French expatriate sportspeople in England
Expatriate women's footballers in England
French sportspeople of Algerian descent
French sportspeople of Moroccan descent
Footballers from Hauts-de-Seine